Band-e Amir National Park Afghanistan established its first national park on April 22, 2009, to promote and protect the natural beauty of a series of intensely blue lakes created by natural dams high in the Hindu Kush. Band-e-Amir is a chain of six lakes in the mountainous desert of central Afghanistan. The lakes formed from mineral-rich water that seeped out of faults and cracks in the rocky landscape. Over time, the water deposited layers of hardened mineral (travertine) that built up into walls that now contain the water. According to the Wildlife Conservation Society, who helped the Afghan government set up the park, Band-e-Amir is one of the few travertine systems in the world.

They were created by the carbon dioxide rich water oozing out of the faults and fractures to deposit calcium carbonate precipitate in the form of travertine walls that today store the water of these lakes. Band-e Amir is one of the few rare natural lakes in the world which are created by travertine systems. The site of Band-e Amir has been described as Afghanistan's Grand Canyon, and draws thousands of tourists a year. The river is part of the system of the Balkh River.


History

The name Band-e Amir literally means "the Ruler's Dam" which is believed by some to be a reference to Ali, the fourth Caliph of the Muslims. The area is dominated by ethnic Hazaras, who are estimated to make up about 40 percent of Afghanistan's population.

In her 1970 guide to Afghanistan, Nancy Dupree wrote that a full description about Band-e Amir would "rob the uninitiated of the wonder and amazement it produces on all who gaze upon it". Parts of the 1975 Bollywood film Dharmatma, with Feroz Khan and Hema Malini, were filmed at the Band-e Amir National Park.

In 2004, Band-e Amir was submitted for recognition as a World Heritage site. Efforts to make Band-e Amir a national park started in the 1970s, but were then put on hold due to the wars. In April 2009, Band-e Amir was finally declared Afghanistan's first national park. As of 2013, about 6,000 local tourists visit the Band-e Amir National Park every year. The area is protected by a small number of park rangers.

Geography 

Band-e Amir is situated at approximately 75 km to the north-west of the ancient city of Bamyan, close to the town of Yakawlang. Together with Bamyan Valley, they are the heart of Afghanistan's tourism, attracting thousands of tourists every year and from every corner of the world. The six constituent lakes of Band-e Amir are:

Band-e Gholaman (Lake of the slaves)
Band-e Qambar (Lake of Caliph Ali's slave)
Band-e Haibat (Lake of grandiose)
Band-e Panir (Lake of cheese)
Band-e Pudina (Lake of wild mint)
Band-e Zulfiqar (Lake of the sword of Ali)

The white travertine dams created by fault lines, which are prevalent in the Band-e Amir Valley, form the barriers between the lakes. Band-e Haibat is the biggest and the deepest of the six, with an average depth of approximately 150 metres, as estimated by the Provincial Reconstruction Team diving team from New Zealand. Another comparable lake is Band-e Azhdahar (The Dragon), located a few kilometres southeast of the town of Bamyan, which has also been created as a result of carbon dioxide rich water oozing out of the faults underground and depositing calcium carbonate precipitate to form the travertine walls of Band-e Amir.

Climate

The climate is extremely severe and the lakes freezing over in winter.

Current status 
After the formal establishment of the park in 2009, a park office with a park warden and a group of rangers was installed to manage the conservation and protection of park natural resources. Wildlife Conservation Society (WCS) is the only non-government organization with an office in the park. WCS supports park staff and works with the local community to promote conservation and sustainable use of natural resources. Ecotourism is expected to decrease local economic dependency on the park's natural resources. Tourists visit Band-e-Amir primarily in the summer months when the weather is warm. A poor local economy and limited outside investment have hampered efforts to attract winter tourism.

The local people in Band-e-Amir National Park rely heavily on the park's natural resources for their livelihood. Grazing of livestock, collection of shrubs for fuel and winter fodder and rain-fed farming is still widely practiced within the park boundary. Although the illegal hunting of birds and a few mammals living in the park is formally prohibited by the park office, there is no current data to evaluate the status of wildlife and biodiversity.

Important Bird Area
A 41,000 ha tract overlapping the national park has been designated an Important Bird Area (IBA) by BirdLife International because it supports populations of Himalayan snowcocks, Hume's larks, white-winged snowfinches, Afghan snowfinches and Eurasian crimson-winged finches.

See also 
List of dams and reservoirs in Afghanistan
Natural areas of Afghanistan
Wakhan National Park
Nuristan National Park

References

Bibliography
Dupree, Nancy Hatch (1977): An Historical Guide to Afghanistan. 1st Edition: 1970. 2nd Edition. Revised and Enlarged. Afghan Tourist Organization.

External links

National parks of Afghanistan
Geography of Bamyan Province
Hazarajat
Lake groups of Afghanistan
Landforms of Bamyan Province
Reservoirs in Afghanistan
Protected areas established in 2009
2009 establishments in Afghanistan
Important Bird Areas of Afghanistan